Iława Główna railway station is the main railway station in the town of Iława, Poland. The station is connected to various cities in Poland via PKP Express Intercity Premium (EIP), Intercity (IC), and Twoje Linie Kolejowe (TLK) services, and various regional cities via Polregio service.

History
The station opened on October 2, 1872, when the town was under German rule. It served as a border station on the German side between Poland and Germany in the interwar period, and following Germany's defeat in World War II it passed to Poland.

Train services
The station is served by the following service(s):

Express Intercity Premium services (EIP) Gdynia - Warsaw
Express Intercity Premium services (EIP) Gdynia - Warsaw - Katowice - Gliwice/Bielsko-Biała
Express Intercity Premium services (EIP) Gdynia/Kołobrzeg - Warsaw - Kraków (- Rzeszów)
 Intercity services (IC) Łódź Fabryczna — Warszawa — Gdańsk Glowny — Kołobrzeg
Intercity services (IC) Szczecin - Koszalin - Słupsk - Lebork - Gdynia - Gdańsk - Malbork - Iława - Olsztyn
Intercity services (TLK) Gdynia Główna — Zakopane 
Intercity services (TLK) Kołobrzeg — Gdynia Główna — Warszawa Wschodnia — Kraków Główny
Regional services (R) Malbork — Iława Główna 
Regional services (R) Iława Główna — Działdowo 
Regional services (R) Jabłonowo Pomorskie — Olsztyn Główny 
Regional services (R) Toruń Główny — Olsztyn Główny 
Regional services (R) Gdynia Chylonia — Olsztyn Główny

See also
Rail transport in Poland

References 

Railway stations in Poland opened in 1872
Railway stations in Warmian-Masurian Voivodeship
Railway stations served by Przewozy Regionalne InterRegio